The Primacy Collegiate Academy (TPCA), formerly Taipei Adventist Preparatory Academy (TAPA), is a private international high school located in Shilin District, Taipei, Taiwan.

In 2002, Adventist College Preparatory Center (ACPC) was founded by Robert Christensen with the purpose of providing part-time English-language tutoring for high school students and college-placement assistance for students interested in attending English-speaking universities. During the first year, the school provided tutoring to 30 students and college placement to 6 students. Throughout the following years, the student population increased and, in 2005, the English-language training was eventually integrated into an American curriculum high school offering regular and Advanced Placement courses. In 2005, the Academy had its first high school graduates—a class of three. In the fall of 2005, ACPC changed its name to Taipei Adventist Preparatory Academy or more commonly known as TAPA.

The Taipei Adventist Preparatory Academy continued to grow throughout the years until in 2012, it reached over 150 students representing twenty plus nationalities.

Accreditation
The Primacy Collegiate Academy follows the American educational system designated for private schools.  Accredited by Cognia.

Notable people 
李玉璽, Class of 2011 - Musician
蔣友青, Class of 2010
Dacie Chao 趙岱新, Class of 2009 -  Journalist
瑞瑪·席丹 - Actress
蘇小軒 - Actress

See also 
 Taipei Adventist American School
 Taiwan Adventist International School

References 

2002 establishments in Taiwan
Educational institutions established in 2002
High schools in Taiwan
International schools in Taipei